The Federation of Euro-Asian Stock Exchanges (FEAS) is a non-profit international organization comprising the main stock exchanges in Eastern Europe, the Middle East, and Central Asia. The purpose of the Federation is to contribute to the cooperation, development, support and promotion of capital markets in Eurasia, although membership in the Federation is open to markets internationally. It was established on 16 May 1995 with 12 founding members. Currently, the FEAS has 43 members which include stock exchanges, post trade institutions, dealers associations, and regional federations from over 30 countries. The Federation's headquarters are located in Yerevan, Armenia.

Membership

Full members
Full members of the Federation of Euro-Asian Stock Exchanges, include:
 - Armenia Securities Exchange and the Central Depository of Armenia
 -Sydney Stock Exchange
 - Belarusian Currency and Stock Exchange
 - Cyprus Stock Exchange
 - Egyptian Exchange and the Misr for Central Clearing, Depository and Registry
 - Athens Stock Exchange
 - Iran Fara Bourse and the Tehran Stock Exchange
 - Iraq Stock Exchange 
 - Amman Stock Exchange
 - Astana International Exchange and the Kazakhstan Stock Exchange
- Boursa Kuwait
   - Macedonian Stock Exchange
 - Muscat Stock Exchange
 - Palestine Exchange
 - Bucharest Stock Exchange
 - Damascus Securities Exchange
 - Tashkent Stock Exchange

Affiliate members
Affiliate members of the Federation of Euro-Asian Stock Exchanges, include:
 European Bank for Reconstruction and Development
  - Central Securities Depository of Iran, Securities Exchange Brokers Association, and Tehran Stock Exchange Tech Mgmt Co
  - Securities Depository Center of Jordan
  - Baymarkets
  - Muscat Clearing & Depository

Observer members
Observer members of the Federation of Euro-Asian Stock Exchanges, include:
  - Banja Luka Stock Exchange
  - Georgian Stock Exchange
  - Moldova Stock Exchange
  - Central Securities Depository of Macedonia
  - Bourse Scot Limited
  - Belgrade Stock Exchange
  - Uzbek Commodity Exchange

Partnerships
The Federation of Euro-Asian Stock Exchanges also maintains various partnership agreements with several financial institutions, including:
 African Securities Exchanges Association
 Arab Federation of Capital Markets 
 Association of Futures Markets
 Association of National Numbering Agencies
 South Asian Federation of Exchanges

See also
 Central banks and currencies of Europe
 List of European stock exchanges
 List of stock exchanges
 List of stock exchanges in Western Asia

References

Organizations established in 1995
Stock exchanges in Asia
Stock exchanges in Europe
Stock exchanges in the Middle East
Business organizations based in Armenia
International economic organizations